Paulo Fernando Craveiro  (born August 11, 1934 in Paraíba, Brazil) is a writer, journalist, columnist and art critic.

Biography

Son of Alfredo Craveiro Costa Leite (lawyer, prosecutor, poet and journalist) and Maria José Niceas Leite, Paulo Fernando Craveiro was born on August 11, 1934 at the Alagoa do Monteiro, today the city of Monteiro, Paraíba. His grandparent were Francisco Assis Leite and Adélia Craveiro Costa Leite. When he was three months old, he came with his family to live in Recife, Pernambuco. He studied at the Faculdade de Direito do Recife. He studied literary style of the Facultad de Filosofía, Universidad de Madrid, won the Carlos Septien Journalism Prize, created by the Instituto de Cultura Hispânica de Madri, attended classes in political theory at George Washington University and perfected in journalism at the Thomson Foundation in Wales. For many years he wrote for newspapers.

Career

He began his professional career as a radio announcer and for journalistic career in television was host of "Um Homem Chamado Notícia" (A Man Called News) in which news of the day and had always ended the broadcast with the famous phrase "head over heels, no one is made of iron". 
  
Followed by a brief instant political career when he was Chief of Staff of the State of Pernambuco, in the era of Governor Nilo Coelho (1967–1971). On this occasion, had the opportunity to receive and cicerone the visit of Queen Elizabeth II, along with Prince Philip, Duke of Edinburgh. 
  
As a journalist he traveled the world several times, and then described his vision through chronicles and newspaper articles on various corners of the world.

Works

Sites
O Boneco Íntimo blog
Paulo Fernando Craveiro's official website

References

Article on Queen Elizabeth's Visit (in Portuguese) http://www.diariodepernambuco.com.br/2009/07/31/especial15_0.asp
O Boneco Ínitimo blog http://obonecointimo.blogspot.com/

Brazilian male writers
People from Paraíba
Portuguese-language writers
Living people
1934 births